The Sehol E20X is an electric subcompact crossover SUV produced under the Sehol brand of JAC Motors.

Overview

The Sehol E20X is the first car produced by Sehol or originally, Sol. The car debuted during the 2018 Beijing Auto Show and is based on the JAC Refine S2 and JAC iEV7S, while featuring a new front that is reminiscent to the front of a SEAT due to the previous plans of bringing electrified SEAT vehicles into China under the Sol brand. The car is only available in China as an electric vehicle.

Sehol or Sol is a car brand launched on April 24, 2018 by SEAT and JAC Volkswagen Automotive Co., Ltd. joint venture, and the Sehol E20X is the first product under the brand.

Powertrain
The production E20X is powered by a permanent magnet synchronous motor with maximum power of 92kW (123 hp) and peak torque of 270 Nm. The battery is the 21700 cylindrical battery supplied from Tianjin Lishen with a capacity of 49.5kWh, and the range declared by MIIT is 249miles (402km), it takes around 50 mins charging from 15% to 80%.

Interior
The E20X features a high-definition 7-inch LCD instrumental panel and an electronic gear lever featuring stitching leather. The seats are crafted with Alcantara and leather. The higher trim models feature keyless entry, a push button starter, an 8-inch central control touch screen, 360 ° parking assist, blind spot monitoring, 4G wireless network connection, charging port cover one-button open, voice control, remote control and air purification system.

References

External links
 
 (Philippines)

2010s cars
Cars introduced in 2018
Cars of China
Crossover sport utility vehicles
Front-wheel-drive vehicles
Sehol E20X
Mini sport utility vehicles
Production electric cars
Electric vehicles